The Battle of Narbonne was a military engagement near Narbonne in 763 during the Aquitanian War. The forces of the Frankish counts Australdus and Galemanius defeated the Aquitanian forces of Count Mantio, killing Mantio and his retinue in the process and routing the Gascon levies in the Aquitanian service.

Prelude
Duke Waiofar of Aquitaine sent his cousin, count Mantio, reinforced with Gascon levies and other magnates and their followings, to take the Frankish-held town of Narbonne in 763. Waiofar's plan was to ambush the Frankish garrison, deployed there against the Muslims, as it attempted to enter the town or leave it for home.

Battle
Counts Australdus and Galemanius, commanding the garrison, were leaving the town with their retinues, when Mantio's men and dismounted Gascon levies attacked them. After a bitter fight, Mantio and all his companions were killed by the Frankish counts. The Gascon levies were routed and the Franks pursued them, taking their horses and other belongings.

Aftermath
Waiofar's attempt to take an important Frankish base at his border ended in failure, as did all of his other efforts to conduct similar raids against the Franks.

Citations

Bibliography
 
 

Narbonne 763
Narbonne
763
8th century in Francia
History of Narbonne